Maureen Koster (born 3 July 1992) is a Dutch middle-distance runner who competes in track and cross country running events. She won the bronze medal in the 3000 metres at the 2015 European Athletics Indoor Championships in Prague.

She was born in Gouda. Se represented her country at the 2010 World Junior Championships in Athletics and the 2013 World Championships in Athletics. She ran in the under-23 section at the 2013 and 2014 European Cross Country Championships, winning a team bronze on the first attempt and coming fifth individually in the latter edition. She also ran in 1500 m at the 2014 European Athletics Championships, but failed to make the final.

Competition record

1Did not finish in the final

Personal bests
Outdoor
800 metres – 2:02.15 (Ninove 2014)
1000 metres – 2:40.09 (Amsterdam 2014)
1500 metres – 3:59.79 (Monaco 2015)
5000 metres – 15:06.86 (Palo Alto 2022)
Indoor
1500 metres – 4:10.68 (Karlsruhe 2016)
3000 metres – 8:49.18 (Glasgow 2016)

References

External links

1992 births
Living people
Dutch female middle-distance runners
Sportspeople from Gouda, South Holland
World Athletics Championships athletes for the Netherlands
Athletes (track and field) at the 2016 Summer Olympics
Olympic athletes of the Netherlands
21st-century Dutch women